Nabumali is a village in Mbale District in eastern Uganda. It is known for its high school, which is over 100 years old.

Location

Nabumali is a village in Mbale District. 
It is in the foothills of Mount Elgon.
The estimated population as of 2020 was 4,400.
The Köppen climate classification is Am : Tropical monsoon climate.

Foundation

At the end of the 19th century the Baganda leader Semei Kakungulu led his army into Bugisu against the Bangokho, then the Bawalasi and Bafumbo further north, and then south to Busoba where he built a fort named Nabumali.
From here he raided into the mountains of southern Bugisu.
The British followed Kakungulu, and although they placed him in retirement in 1902 in Mbale they used his Ganda followers as police and chiefs.

School

Nabumali High School was founded by the Church Mission Society (CMS) at Mivule near the town of Mbale, and was moved to Nabumale in 1912.
For many years Archdeacon Henry Mathers (1877–1951) of the CMS Nabumali Mission was the official patron of the Bagishu Welfare Association.
This was a largely Anglican organization with the stated objectives of working for the uplift of the Gisu people, developing the land and assisting members who needed help.
On 16 June 1970 President Milton Obote told the assembled students of Nabumali High School, "We must have this One Uganda; we must have this One People; we must have this One Parliament, so that the youth of Uganda of today and tomorrow will see Uganda as a whole…. We must begin to have our own history".
In 2012 President Yoweri Museveni attended the school's centenary celebrations.

Notes

Sources

}
 

 

Populated places in Uganda